The 2010 season was Santos Futebol Clube's ninety-eighth season in existence and the club's fifty-first consecutive season in the top flight of Brazilian football.

On 4 December 2009, Luis Álvaro de Oliveira Ribeiro was elect President for the next two years.

This season marked the new Meninos da Vila generation, where Neymar, Ganso, Rafael, Wesley, André, alongside Robinho (who joined the club on a six-month loan deal) and others players, helped Santos win their 18th Campeonato Paulista title, beating Santo André in the finals.
Santos also won the Copa do Brasil title, winning for the first time in history. It was the culmination of a campaign marked by a devastating team with relentless wins, as against Naviraiense 10–0 and 8–1 against Guarani, game in which Neymar scored five goals.
In the second half of the year, losses of key players as Wesley (sold to Werder Bremen), André (sold to Dynamo Kyiv), Robinho (who returned to Manchester City), Ganso (who suffered an Anterior cruciate ligament injury), and the dismissal of coach Dorival Junior after a misunderstanding involving Neymar, Santos was unable to go beyond an 8th place in the Campeonato Brasileiro and postponed the conquest of the "triple crown" (symbolic title given to whoever wins in the same year, the State Championship, the Brazil Cup and Brazil League).

Players

Squad information

Appearances and goals

a  Player from Youth System with first team experience.

Last updated: 5 December 2010Source: Match reports in competitive matches

Top scorers

{| class="wikitable"
|-
!|
!|Name
!|Brasileirão
!|Paulistão
!|Copa do Brasil
!|Sudamericana
!|Total
|-
|align=center|1
| Neymar
|align=center|17
|align=center|14
|align=center|11
|align=center|0
|align=center|42
|-
|align=center|2
| André
|align=center|5
|align=center|13
|align=center|8
|align=center|0
|align=center|26
|-
|align=center|3
| Zé Eduardo
|align=center|10
|align=center|6
|align=center|0
|align=center|2
|align=center|18
|-
|align=center|4
| Ganso
|align=center|0
|align=center|11
|align=center|2
|align=center|0
|align=center|13
|-
|align=center|5
| Robinho
|align=center|0
|align=center|5
|align=center|6
|align=center|0
|align=center|11
|-
|align=center|6
| Wesley
|align=center|2
|align=center|6
|align=center|2
|align=center|0
|align=center|10
|-
|align=center|7
| Madson
|align=center|2
|align=center|4
|align=center|2
|align=center|0
|align=center|8
|-

Disciplinary record

Club

Coaching staff

Kit

|

|

Transfers

In

Out

b Included in Arouca loan.

Out on loan

Friendlies

Sources:

Competitions

Overview

Campeonato Brasileiro

League table

Results summary

Results by round

Matches

Campeonato Paulista

Results summary

First stage

League table

Matches

Knockout stage

Semi-finals

Finals

Copa do Brasil

First round

Second round

Round of 16

Quarter-finals

Semi-finals

Finals

Copa Sudamericana

Second round

References

External links
Official Website
Official Youtube Channel

Brazilian football clubs 2010 season
2010